Hyles annei is a moth of the  family Sphingidae.

Distribution 
It is known from Chile, Bolivia, western Peru and Argentina.

Description

Biology 
Adults are on wing in January, August and probably other months.

The larval hosts are unknown, but they will probably feed on a wide range of plants including Epilobium, Mirabilis, Oenothera, Vitis, Lycopersicon, Portulaca, Fuchsia, Gaura lindheimerii, Alternanthera pungens and Euphorbia dentata or related plants found in a dry climate.

References

Hyles (moth)
Moths described in 1839